Diosbert Alexander Rivero Cantillo (born 3 May 2000) is a Venezuelan footballer who plays for Spanish club CD Calamonte as a forward.

Club career
Born in Guanare, Rivero was a Llaneros de Guanare youth graduate. He started to appear with the first team during the 2017 season, with the club in the second division, and scored three league goals during his two-year spell at the main squad, helping in their promotion in 2018.

In January 2019, Rivero moved abroad and joined Spanish club Extremadura UD, being initially assigned to the reserves in Tercera División. He made his professional debut on 4 June, coming on as a late substitute for Kike Márquez in a 1–0 away win against Cádiz CF in the Segunda División championship.

On 15 July 2019, Rivero signed a four-year contract with Segunda División B side Burgos CF.

Honours
Llaneros de Guanare
Venezuelan Segunda División: 2018

References

External links

2000 births
Living people
People from Guanare
Venezuelan footballers
Association football forwards
Venezuelan Segunda División players
Llaneros de Guanare players
Segunda División players
Segunda División B players
Tercera División players
Tercera Federación players
Extremadura UD B players
Extremadura UD footballers
Burgos CF footballers
Venezuelan expatriate footballers
Venezuelan expatriate sportspeople in Spain
Expatriate footballers in Spain